Changes is the third solo album by former Five Stairsteps member Keni Burke. It was released in 1982 on  RCA Records and includes the often sampled track "Risin' to the Top"

Track listing 
 "Shakin'" (Keni Burke, Norma Jean Wright)		
 "Hang Tight" (Burke, Allan Felder)		 		
 "Can't Get Enough (Do It All Night)" (Burke, Allan Felder, Dean Gant)		 		
 "Who Do You Love" (Burke, Allan Felder)
 "Let Somebody Love You" (Burke)		 		
 "Changes" (Burke)		 		
 "One Minute More" (Burke, Linda Creed)		 		
 "Risin' to the Top" (Burke, Allan Felder, Norma Jean Wright)		 		
 "All Night" (Burke, Allan Felder, Dean Gant)

Personnel 
 Keni Burke – Bass, rhythm guitar, synthesizer (Prophet 5), percussion, wurlitzer, vocals, backing vocals
 Steve Ferrone – Drums
 Ed "Tree" Moore – Lead guitar, rhythm guitar
 Leonard "Dockta" Gibbs, Jr. – Percussion
 Vince Montana – Vibraphone
 Don Myrick, Louis Satterfield, Michael Harris, Rahmlee Lee Davis – Horns
 "Sir" Dean Gant – Synthesizer (Moog Bass), piano (Fender Rhodes)
 Ed Walsh – Vocoder (Obx), synthesizer (Prophet 5)
 Barbara Ingram, Carla Benson, Evette L. Benton, Tawatha Agee, Day Askey Burke, Terri Askey – Backing vocals
 Leon "Ndugu" Chancler – Drums, percussion on "Let Somebody Love You"
 Michael Thompson – Guitar on "You're the Best"
 Joe Tarsia – Recording and mixing
 Edward "Chappie" Johnson – Executive producer

Charts

Singles

Samples
Doug E. Fresh sampled "Risin' to the Top" on his song "Keep Risin' to the Top" on his album The World's Greatest Entertainer in 1988.
Big Daddy Kane sampled "Risin' to the Top" on his song "Smooth Operator" on his album It's a Big Daddy Thing in 1989.
LL Cool J sampled "Risin' to the Top" on his song "Around the Way Girl" on his album Mama Said Knock You Out in 1990 and Later Sampled it On his Song Paradise on his Album 10
Mary J. Blige sampled "Risin' to the Top" on her song "Love No Limit" on her album What's the 411? Remix in 1993.
Pete Rock & CL Smooth sampled "Risin' to the Top" on their song "Take You There" on their album The Main Ingredient in 1994.
O.C. sampled "Risin' to the Top" on his song "Born 2 Live" on his album Word...Life in 1994.

References

External links 
 Keni Burke-Changes at Discogs

1982 albums
Keni Burke albums
RCA Records albums
Albums recorded at Sigma Sound Studios